Gnorimoschema motasi is a moth in the family Gelechiidae. It was described by Povolný in 1977. It is found in Colombia.

References

Gnorimoschema
Moths described in 1977